Vardø Chapel or Steglnes Chapel is a chapel of the Church of Norway in Vardø Municipality in Troms og Finnmark county, Norway. It is located on the western part of the island of Vardøya in the town of Vardø, just south of the historic Vardøhus Fortress. It is an annex chapel for the Vardø parish which is part of the Varanger prosti (deanery) in the Diocese of Nord-Hålogaland.

The small white chapel was built in 1908 at the site of the new parish cemetery. It has mostly been used for funerals, but more recently it has been opened up for weddings and baptisms also. Unlike most churches in Finnmark county, this one was not burned down during World War II.

See also
List of churches in Nord-Hålogaland

References

Vardø
Churches in Finnmark
Wooden churches in Norway
20th-century Church of Norway church buildings
Churches completed in 1908
1908 establishments in Norway
Long churches in Norway